The 1932 Tour de France was the 26th edition of the Tour de France, one of cycling's Grand Tours. The Tour began in Paris with a flat stage on 6 July, and Stage 11 occurred on 21 July with a mountainous stage to Gap. The race finished in Paris on 31 July.

Stage 1
6 July 1932 - Paris to Caen,

Stage 2
7 July 1932 - Caen to Nantes,

Stage 3
9 July 1932 - Nantes to Bordeaux,

Stage 4
11 July 1932 - Bordeaux to Pau,

Stage 5
12 July 1932 - Pau to Luchon,

Stage 6
14 July 1932 - Luchon to Perpignan,

Stage 7
16 July 1932 - Perpignan to Montpellier,

Stage 8
17 July 1932 - Montpellier to Marseille,

Stage 9
18 July 1932 - Marseille to Cannes,

Stage 10
19 July 1932 - Cannes to Nice,

Stage 11
21 July 1932 - Nice to Gap,

References

1932 Tour de France
Tour de France stages